Forkel can refer to:
 Johann Nikolaus Forkel (1749–1818), a German musician and music theorist
 Friedrich Forkel (1822-1890), a German jurist
 Karen Forkel (*1970), a German track and field athlete
 Martin Forkel (*1979), a German soccer defender